Rock Barn Farm, also known as the Hoke-Roseman Farm, is a historic farm located near Claremont, Catawba County, North Carolina. It has 4 contributing buildings, 2 contributing site and 2 contributing structures. The house was built about 1870, and is a two-story, vernacular Greek Revival style frame farmhouse.  Also on the property are the contributing remnant of Island Ford Road, corn crib, car shed, granary, two story bank barn known as the "Rock Barn" (c. 1822), foundation wall, and the farm acreage.

It was added to the National Register of Historic Places in 1990.

References

Farms on the National Register of Historic Places in North Carolina
Greek Revival houses in North Carolina
Houses completed in 1870
Houses in Catawba County, North Carolina
National Register of Historic Places in Catawba County, North Carolina